Invisible Cinema is an album by jazz pianist and composer Aaron Parks, that was released on the Blue Note label on August 19, 2008.  The album is Parks' debut for Blue Note.

Track listing
 "Travelers"
 "Peaceful Warrior"
 "Nemesis"
 "Riddle Me This"
 "Into the Labyrinth"
 "Karma"
 "Roadside Distraction"
 "Harvesting Dance"
 "Praise"
 "Afterglow"

Personnel
Aaron Parks – piano, mellotron, glockenspiel, synthesizers
Mike Moreno - guitar
Matt Penman – bass
Eric Harland – drums

References

External links
 

Post-bop albums
2008 albums
Blue Note Records albums